Nastia viridula is a species of small, air-breathing land snail, a terrestrial pulmonate gastropod mollusk in the family Oxychilidae.

Description
The width of the shell is 12 mm.

Distribution
The distribution of Nastia viridula includes north-eastern Turkey.

References

Oxychilidae
Gastropods described in 1989
Endemic fauna of Turkey